Ulrich Daldrup (born 27 September 1947) is a former political leader and mayor of the German city of Aachen. He is an expert in International Cooperation and in Humanitarian Aid, and worked and lived many years in Africa and Asia.

Youth 
Daldrup was born in Porta Westfalica, Germany, and grew up in Brussels, Belgium where his father Franz Daldrup had been delegated in 1958 by then German Minister of Economic Affairs, Ludwig Erhard, to assist in the foundation of the European Economic Community. Daldrup graduated from the European School, Brussels I in 1965, obtaining his European Baccalaureate. Subsequently, he undertook a one-year apprenticeship in banking with Brussels Lambert Bank. In 1971 he finished his study of chemistry and of economics at the Technical University of Aachen with two master's degrees/Diplomas (in chemistry and in economics) and a PhD. In 1972 he married Elfi Herrny.

International career 

 From 1972 until late 1974 Daldrup lived in Rabat, Morocco. The German Ministry of International Cooperation had delegated him as governmental advisor to the Moroccan government. The same Ministry used his services until 1985 for the management of its humanitarian aid programs. Daldrup coordinated humanitarian aid projects of the German government in Africa and in Latin America. In 1989 the European Commission appointed him as advisor to the Minister of Industry and later President of Mauritius, Cassam Uteem. From 2000 until 1 May 2004, Daldrup was delegated by German government as Commissioner to Riga, Latvia. In 2007 he was appointed CEO of Energy Hills and in 2013 Chairman of the European Agency for Sustainable Energy (EASE)..

Political career 
From 1994 until 1999 he served as the Mayor of the city of Aachen. From 1993 till 1999 he was also head of the CDU in Aachen. He was co-founder of the Maastricht-based Euregio Council and the Euregio EVP. He was President of the Mittelstandsvereinigung till 2005. In 2004 Daldrup founded the international "Business Club Aachen Maastricht", whose President he remains. In 2006 he was appointed vice-president of the humanitarian Water for the World Foundation, whose headquarters are in Maastricht.

Academic career 
Since 1984 Daldrup has been teaching international law and business administration at the Technical University of Cologne, where he is appointed as Professor. The University of Aachen appointed him as lecturer in 2004 for "International Management". From 1996 to 1999 Daldrup was Dean of the University of Bradford/NIMBAS, MBA Campus of Aachen. Daldrup was lecturer at the Kaunas Technical University in Lithuania, where he created the first Technology Center/Incubator. For this he was honoured with the Doctor Honoris Causis in 2000. Daldrup also gave lectures at the University of Stettin in Poland and Georgetown University, United States. The emphasis of its research is regional development and policy, European treaties and international cooperation.

He has published a number of books on international cooperation.

Distinctions 

 “Doctor Honoris Causa” by the Technical University of Kaunas
 “Bundesverdienstkreuz am Bande” of the Federal Republic of Germany
 "Order of Merit of the Federal Republic of Germany"
 “Honorarprofessor” of the University of Applied Sciences of Cologne
 “Ehrentaler” of the Handwerkskammer Rhein-Main

Publications 

 Economic Guide Nigeria
 Economic Guide ECOWAS Countries
 Economic Guide Sri Lanka
 Economic Guide Bangladesh
 The Industrial Sector in Cameroon
 The Industrial Sector in Chad
 Ernährungssicherung und Nahrungsmittelhilfe - ein Instrument der Entwicklungshilfe
 Handicraft in Mauritius
 Handicraft in Morocco

References

External links 
 Official Webpage
 
 http://www.aachener-nachrichten.de/news/wirtschaft/business-club-aachen-maastricht-ehrt-reinhold-wuerth-1.339264
 http://en.ktu.lt/content/about-ktu/honorary-doctors
 http://campus-info.noc.fh-aachen.de/campus/all/lecturer.asp?gguid=0x9477FF372CF4E54BAB4AE29D7AEB66F0&tguid=0xE7EFE18DF893F04F80C0615E53BDE9E5
 http://www.energyhills.eu
 http://www.businessclub-aachen.com
 http://www.gfe.de

1947 births
Living people
People from Minden-Lübbecke
Christian Democratic Union of Germany politicians
Recipients of the Cross of the Order of Merit of the Federal Republic of Germany
Academic staff of RWTH Aachen University
Mayors of Aachen
Alumni of the European Schools